Auldbrass Plantation or Auldbrass is located in Beaufort County, South Carolina, near the town of Yemassee. The main house, stable complex and kennels were designed and built by Frank Lloyd Wright from 1939 to 1941. It is one of two structures that Wright designed in South Carolina. The property was purchased in the 1930s by Charles Leigh Stevens. Wright designed the plantation to serve as a retreat for Stevens. During Stevens retreats he would use the property for riding and hunting excursions.

Wright is credited with changing the name of the plantation from "Old Brass" to "Auldbrass." "Old Brass" was the original name given to the farmland and the local river landing after an old slave from an old plantation on the land before. The earliest records from the farm are dated to 1736 when the farm was known as Mount Pleasant. An industrial engineer, C. Leigh Stevens, joined five parcels of land together along the Combahee River to form the plantation. The plantation was added to the National Register of Historic Places in 1976. It was purchased in 1986 by film producer Joel Silver after Donna Butler, an FLW real estate appraiser, convinced him to restore it. Auldbrass Plantation is an extraordinary example of historic preservation and is open to the public one weekend every two years. Tours benefit the Beaufort County Open Land Trust.

Design 
The Auldbrass Plantation was a collection of buildings. This included the main residence, cottages, guest house, caretaker's quarters, chicken runs, kennels, stables, and Granary. The main residence and a few of the other buildings implemented a hexagon module floorplan. When approaching the house, there was no grand entrance, the driveways were angled to lead visitors the farm buildings before getting to the main residence. The main residence is inspired by the nature around it, the vertically oriented brick walls and sloping cypress wood walls with narrow windows. The residence also as cooper roof with rainspouts mimicking the Spanish moss hanging from the oak trees. Apon entering the residence on the right is the living room with its clerestory like windows running above is to the right and the fireplace on the back wall. Around the fireplace is the breakfast room. To the left are the two bedrooms.

References

External links
 American Memory from the Library of Congress
 American Memory - outer buildings
 South Carolina Plantations
 Many detailed images large page size
 Sunday Morning, CBS News 26 photos

 Beaufort County Open Land Trust

Historic American Buildings Survey in South Carolina
Houses on the National Register of Historic Places in South Carolina
Frank Lloyd Wright buildings
Plantations in South Carolina
Plantation houses in South Carolina
Houses in Beaufort County, South Carolina
Houses completed in 1951
National Register of Historic Places in Beaufort County, South Carolina